Hum Zabočki  is a village in Croatia. It is connected by the D1 highway and railway corridors R201 and L202.

External links
Geographic.org

Populated places in Krapina-Zagorje County